Survival of Dana is a 1979 CBS made-for-TV film, a teenage drama starring Melissa Sue Anderson, who experiences conflicting social values when her parents divorce and she moves from Fargo, North Dakota to the San Fernando Valley suburbs of Los Angeles.

The cast also includes Robert Carradine, Talia Balsam, Marion Ross, and Judge Reinhold in his first film. Anderson was on hiatus from Little House on the Prairie and Ross (playing Dana's grandmother) was at the time a star on the series Happy Days. The Survival of Dana was directed by Jack Starrett, whose only child, Jennifer, plays Lynn, one of the members of the antisocial clique.

Plot
Dana Lee Gilbert has moved from Fargo to the San Fernando Valley to live with her widowed grandmother after her parents' divorce. She finds her new school, Tremont High, was vandalized the night before by a teenage gang led by Donny Davis. At the end of her first day, she watches the school's ice skating team practice and wants to try out for it. Waiting for her grandmother at a shopping mall, she meets another Tremont girl, Rona Simms, who shoplifts and they are both arrested. Banned from skating, she joins the gang and starts dating Donny. One of the gang's big plans brings them into conflict with adult criminals.

Cast
 Melissa Sue Anderson as Dana Lee Gilbert
 Robert Carradine as Donny Davis
 Marion Ross as Madeline
 Talia Balsam as Rona Simms
 Michael Pataki as Arnold
 Kevin Breslin as Skates
 Judge Reinhold as Bear
 Dan Spector as Anthony
 Barbara Babcock as Lorna Sims
 Shelby Leverington as Mrs. Blake
 Dawn Jeffory as Joanie
 Trent Dolan as Coach Tanner
 Scott McGinnis as Paul

References

External links
 

1979 television films
1979 films
American television films
Films scored by Craig Safan
Films directed by Jack Starrett